Anna Carolina Laudon (born March 12, 1971) is a typographic designer and graphic designer. Educated in Fine Art at Gerlesborgsskolan in Stockholm, Laudon earned a master's degree in graphic design at HDK School of Design and Crafts at the University of Gothenburg in Sweden, where she made her first font. She is fascinated in social topics such as Feminism, Human Issues, Intersectionality and Global Communication.

Born in Stockholm, Sweden, Carolina Laudon studied Book history, Intellectual properties and digital information, and Practical Design Research. She followed a higher education teacher training at Linnaeus University. For seven years, Laudon taught typography and type design at Konstfack, The University of Arts, Crafts and Design in Stockholm.

In 2012, Carolina Laudon received the Berling Award, which is Sweden's most prestigious typographic design award and in 2014 she was given The Sten A Olsson Foundation for Research and Culture Award.

Laudon Design AB
In 2000, Carolina Laudon launched her own type design studio called Laudon Design. It ran as a one-woman independent type studio located in Gothenburg, Sweden. The Laudon Design studio offers custom type design and lettering art, font development, logotype, typography and any discussions related to typography and type design.

Laudon also has a long record of book design and book typography, custom lettering with monograms, and graphic design work.

Laudon Design produced some of the most used corporate typefaces in Sweden, such as Monopoly. This typeface was shaped originally in England, created to imitate late 19th century typefaces. Its first launch was in 2003, when the font was modified for business companies. These companies included: Systembolaget, LF for Länsförsäkringar, Rusta Pris for Rusta AB, DN Bodoni and DN Grotesk.

In 2001, Laudon was commissioned by insurance company Försakringbolaget IF to create a font that looks similar to a salesperson's handwriting. Taking the time to study recommendations from English writer Alfred Fairbank and the Beacon Press company, Laudon designed LTD Handskrift, a script font.

Laudon also created the typefaces Endure, LTD Vichy, Laudon Stockholm Sans, LTD Pamskrift, LTD Shake, LTD Sthlm Sans, LTD Cartoon, and LTD Cut. She also created the typeface White Dark, which was designed for a architect company called White Architects. With this company, she made special fonts that F&B Happy assigned her to work on.

Laudon explores material, format and historical writing. In 2014, at the screening of the Gothenburg Art Museum, she exhibited part of her work process in illuminated displays. She created fonts for System Bolaget, Dagens Nyheter and Akademibokhandeln.

References

Sources

 http://laudon.se/about
 http://halloffemmes.com/interview/carolina-laudon/
 http://luc.devroye.org/fonts-40205.html

Swedish graphic designers
1971 births
Living people
University of Gothenburg alumni
Artists from Stockholm